Term Limits, published in 1997, is the first political thriller novel by Vince Flynn.

Plot introduction
Three of Washington's most powerful politicians are executed. The assassins demand that the American government set aside partisan politics and restore power to the people, specifically a balanced budget amendment and term limits for all of Congress. Michael O'Rourke, a U.S. Marine turned Congressman finds out who they are and why they do it.

Characters
The major characters in Term Limits include:
President Jim Stevens – President of the United States
Stu Garret – White House Chief of Staff
Congressman Michael O'Rourke – Freshman Congressman from Minnesota and a U.S. Marine
Mike Nance – National Security Advisor
Brian Roach – Director of the FBI
Skip McMahon – Special Agent in charge of the Investigation of the assassinations
Dr. Irene Kennedy – CIA Terrorism Expert
Thomas Stansfield – Director of the CIA
Arthur Higgins – Retired CIA Director of Black Ops
Scott Coleman – Former Navy SEAL, assassin team leader

Publication history
 1997, US, Cloak & Dagger Press, Incorporated , Pub August 1997, Hardback
1998, US, Atria Press , Pub 1 June 1998, Hardback
1999, US, Pocket Star Books, Pub 1 January 1999, Mass Market Paperback
2003, US, Pocket Books, Pub 2 June 2003, Paperback
2004, US, Atria , Pub 1 November 2004, Hardback
2007, US, Pocket Books , Pub 30 June 2007, Paperback

References

External links

1997 American novels
American political novels
Novels by Vince Flynn
Novels set in Washington, D.C.
1997 debut novels